Damien Sargue  (born 26 June 1981) is a French pop singer known for his performance of Romeo in Gérard Presgurvic's Roméo et Juliette, de la Haine à l'Amour. A French native, he grew up in Caen, Normandy, France with
his mother Miriam, his father Pierre, brother Julien, and his sisters Julie and Sarah, until his parents divorced when he was only a year old.
When he was little boy he wanted to practice karate but his mom registered him in song lessons in Caen Ecole des Variétés de Caen. In 2009, Sargue married his Romeo et Juliette co-star Joy Esther, but the couple divorced a year later. In 2017, he married dancer Emily Surde, who was also in the Romeo et Juliette dance troupe, with whom he has daughter, Billie-Rose, born in 2014.

Career

He started his career as a singer in 1992 in the program Numéros 1 de Demain in France and with his first single Emmène-moi.
When he was 11 years old he decided that his artistic name was going to be Damien Danza, in relation to his favorite TV program Who's the Boss? where Tony Danza was the principal character.

At 16 years old Damien auditioned in the show Notre-Dame de Paris for the character of a sculptor but that character was removed of the show, so they offered him to be alternate of Phoebus and Gringoire. In 1998 was his first time on stage in Palais des congrès de Paris : he had been on stage almost 80 times supplying Patrick Fiori or Bruno Pelletier.

In 2001 he performed the principal role in Roméo et Juliette, de la Haine à l'Amour as Romeo Montague with Cécilia Cara as the role of Juliette Capulet.

In 2004 he provided the French dub for Raoul de Chagny in The Phantom of the Opera by Joel Schumacher. His first album as a solo called Merci was released.

In 2006 he played the role of Romeo again in the Asia tour of Romeo et Juliette that launched in Korea.

In 2007 he created his first album in Asia.

In 2008 Damien had his first concert as a solo in Seoul, Korea (on 23 May).

In 2010 Damien played the role of Romeo in the new version of the musical Romeo et Juliette in Paris (Romeo et Juliette, Les enfants de Vérone).

In 2012, he participated to the Jean-Jacques Goldman's tribute with Génération Goldman'''s album. He sang Né en 17 à Leidenstadt with Amaury Vassili, Anggun.

In 2013, Damien was in the fourth season of Danse avec les stars. He joined the Forever Gentlemen's project.

In 2014, he joined the project Latin Lovers with Julio Iglesias Jr. and Nuno Resende plus others.

In 2016, he played Aramis in the French musical Les Trois Mousquetaires.

In 2018 he picked up the role of Roméo again in Roméo et Juliette for the Asia Tour in China.

 Discography 

 Singles 
 Emmène-moi (1992)
 Les Rois du monde (2000 France No.1, Belgium No.1)
 Aimer with Cécilia Cara (2000 France No.2, Belgium No.2)
 On dit dans la rue (2000 France No.21, Belgium No.32)
 Merci (2004 France No.64)
 Quelque chose pour quelqu'un (2004)
 Elle vient quand elle vient (2005)
 Avoir 20 ans (Roméo et Juliette, 2010) 
 On prie (Roméo et Juliette, 2010)
 Un faux départ (Single caritatif, 2013)
 La belle vie with Roch Voisone & Dany Brillant (2013 France No.95)
 Vous les femmes with Nuno Resende & Julio Iglesias Jr. (2014 France No.108)
 Solamente Tù with Pablo Alborán (2014)
 Un Jour (2015 France No.155)
 J'ai Besoin D'amour Comme Tout Le Monde (2016)

 EP 
 Pinocchio, la renaissance (2011)
 Ca sert à quoi tout ça : Damien Sargue
 Me déchaîner de toi : Frédéric Charter
 A force d'amour : Aurore Delplace
 Tout savoir : Damien Sargue, Aurore Delplace
 Etre un homme : Stefanny Rodrigue

 Albums 
 Roméo et Juliette, de la haine à l'amour (2000 France No.1, Belgium No.1, Switzerland No.9)
 Roméo et Juliette, de la haine à l'amour: L'Integrale (2000 France No.4, Belgium No.30)
 Roméo et Juliette, de la haine à l'amour: Live (2001 France No.15, Belgium No.28)
 Damien Sargue (2007)
 Roméo et Juliette, les enfants de Vérone (2010 France No.80)
 Forever Gentlemen (2013 France No.2, Belgium No.2)
 Latin Lovers (2014 France No.7, Belgium No.13)
 Forever Gentlemen 2 (2014 France No.3, Belgium No.3, Switzerland No.9)
 Les Trois Mousquetaires'' (2016 France No.6, Belgium No.36)

Dvds
Romeo et Juliette (2000 DVD)
Romeo et Juliette (2000 VHS)
Romeo et Juliette, Les enfants de Vérone (2010,2011 DVD)

References

External links
 
 Official site Latin Lovers

1981 births
Living people
Place of birth missing (living people)
French male musical theatre actors
French male singers